The 1923–24 season was Stoke's 24th season in the Football League and the fifth in the Second Division.

With Stoke back in the Second Division after their short stay in the First and without a manager the supporters questioned what the future held for the club. Tom Mather was appointed as the club's new manager in October 1923 and it would start a run of consistency as from 1923 to 1976 Stoke had just four managers.
Mather led the club to sixth position in the table with just two wins in their last 12 matches costing Stoke a promotion challenge. At the end of the season Mather decided to sell a number of players including fans favourites Jimmy Broad, Tommy Broad and Billy Tempest; some players not asked to re-sign smashed up the offices at the Victoria Ground and caused a considerable amount of damage.

Season review

League
There was little money available for new players, and when former Southend United boss Tom Mather, a Lancastrian from Chorley, was given the managerial position in October, he quickly set about restoring the team's fortunes. Mather, who had been assistant manager at both Manchester City and Bolton Wanderers before becoming manager at Burnden Park during World War I, certainly consolidated the club and a final league finish of 6th was a decent outcome and would give Mather a platform to build on.

There was however a regrettable incident at the club just as the season ended when a group of players, who had not been asked to re-sign for the next season, arrived at the Victoria Ground and started smashing up the offices and dressing rooms, causing a considerable amount of damage. The offenders were immediately released by the club and things were quickly sorted out. There was a substantial clear-out, with a number of players leaving who had served the club well whilst there was also changes at boardroom level with chairman Mr E. Reynish relinquishing his position as chairman and wealthy director John Slater also left after he had injected a lot of his own money into the club with mixed success.

FA Cup
No progress was made in the FA Cup with Stoke going out in the first round to Leeds United.

Final league table

Results
Stoke's score comes first

Legend

Football League Second Division

FA Cup

Squad statistics

References

Stoke City F.C. seasons
Stoke